This is a list of rural localities in Vladimir Oblast. Vladimir Oblast (Vladimirskaya oblast) is a federal subject of Russia (an oblast). As of the 2010 Census, the oblast's population was 1,443,693.

Alexandrovsky District 
Rural localities in Alexandrovsky District:

 Afanasyevo
 Afonasovo
 Agafonka
 Aksenovka
 Alabukhino
 Aleksino
 Andreyevskoye
 Anisimka
 Antonka
 Arkhanka
 Arsaki
 Arsaki
 Bakino
 Baksheyevo
 Banevo
 Bashkino
 Bazunovo
 Belteyevka
 Bolshiye Vyoski
 Bolshoye Karinskoye
 Bolshoye Marinkino
 Bolshoye Mikhalyovo
 Bolshoye Shimonovo
 Brykovy Gory
 Bukhary
 Bunkovo
 Chernetskoye
 Chetvert
 Chislavl
 Danilkovo
 Daryino
 Demyanovo
 Dolgopolye
 Dolmatovo
 Dubna
 Dudenevo
 Dvoriki
 Fedyaykovo
 Fyodorovskoye
 Gideyevo
 Godunovo
 Goltsovo
 Gorki
 Gorki
 Grigorovo
 Grigorovo
 Grigorovo
 Irkovo
 Isayevka
 Iskra
 Ivankovo
 Ivanovo-Sobolevo
 Ivanovskoye, Andreyevskoye Rural Settlement
 Ivanovskoye, Karinskoye Rural Settlement
 Izmaylovo
 Kablukovo
 Kalinino
 Kamenka
 Kashino
 Kholopovo
 Khoroshevo
 Klemyachevo
 Klenovka
 Kolpakovo
 Komshilovo
 Konishchevo
 Konyukhovo
 Koptsevo
 Kopylikha
 Korely
 Koskovo
 Kozlakovo
 Krasnaya Roshcha
 Krasnoye Plamya
 Kruglyshevo
 Krutets
 Kudrino
 Kulikovka
 Kurganikha
 Legkovo
 Leninskaya Sloboda
 Lisavy
 Lizunovo
 Lobkovo
 Luch
 Lukyantsevo
 Lunyovo
 Makhra
 Malinovo
 Maloye Karinskoye
 Maloye Marinkino
 Maloye Mikhalyovo
 Maloye Shimonovo
 Malye Vyoski
 Marino
 Maryonkino
 Mashkovo
 Mayak
 Mayovka
 Maysky
 Mezhakovo
 Monastyryovo
 Moshnino
 Myachkovo
 Naumovo
 Nedyurevka
 Neglovo
 Nikolayevka
 Novosyolka, Andreyevskoye Rural Settlement
 Novosyolka, Slednevskoye Rural Settlement
 Novovoskresenskoye
 Novozhilovo
 Obashevo
 Patkino
 Perematkino
 Pesochnaya
 Petrakovo
 Pikalevo
 Plekhany
 Ploshchevo
 Podsosenye
 Podvyazye
 Pokrov
 Polinosovo
 Porechye
 Posyolok Torfopredpriyatiya
 Posyolok imeni Lenina
 Povarovo
 Prechistino, Andreevsky Rural Settlement
 Prechistino, Slednevskoye Rural Settlement
 Prokino
 Prokofyevo
 Pustyn
 Ratkovo
 Romanovo
 Romanovskoye
 Rozhdestveno
 Rupusovo
 Ryabinino
 Ryuminskoye
 Samarino
 Shablykino
 Shchekotovo
 Shikhovo
 Shiklovo
 Shimokhtino
 Shushkovo
 Sivkovo
 Slednevo
 Snyatinovo
 Sokolovo
 Sorokino
 Spornovo
 Stanovishchi
 Staraya
 Staraya Sloboda
 Starinki
 Starovo
 Stepanikha
 Stepanikha
 Stepkovo
 Sushchyovo
 Suslovka
 Svetly
 Svinkino
 Taratino
 Tatyanino
 Temkino
 Tiribrovo
 Tirinovo
 Turgenevo
 Vedevo
 Vertyagino
 Veski
 Vishnyakovo
 Volodino
 Voskresenskoye
 Vyalkovka
 Vyazmino
 Yam
 Yanshino
 Yelkino
 Yelovki
 Yurtsovo
 Zelentsino
 Zhabrevo
 Zhelnino
 Zhuklino
 Zinovyevo
 Zvyaginy Gory

Gorokhovetsky District 
Rural localities in Gorokhovetsky District:

 Aksakovo
 Alfyorovo
 Arefino
 Balandino
 Bereznitsy
 Bogorodskoye
 Bolshaya Karpovka
 Bolshiye Luzhki
 Bolshoye Sokurovo
 Botulino
 Bykasovo
 Byltsyno
 Chernenkovo
 Chudskaya
 Chulkovo
 Chulkovo
 Denisovo
 Dubovo
 Dubrovo
 Fedorkovo
 Fominki
 Galitsy
 Gashkino
 Gonchary
 Gorlovka
 Gornoye Tatarintsevo
 Gorodishchi
 Grishino
 Gruzdevsky
 Istomino
 Ivachevo
 Kartaganovo
 Khabalyovo
 Khoroshevo
 Khoroshevo
 Knyazhichi
 Kolesnikovo
 Kondyurino
 Kopsovo
 Korovkino
 Koshelikha
 Kozhino
 Kraskovo
 Krasnaya Yablon
 Kruglovo
 Krutovo
 Krylovo
 Kuplya
 Kupriyanovo
 Leonovo
 Lesnoye Tatarintsevo
 Lipovka
 Litovka
 Luchinki
 Lykshino
 Malaya Karpovka
 Malinovo
 Malye Luzhki
 Manylovo
 Melkishevo
 Mikhaylovskaya
 Misyurevo
 Mitino
 Mokeyevo
 Molodniki
 Morozovka
 Murakovo
 Myasnikovo
 Nikitkino
 Novishki
 Novokostsy
 Novosemyonovka
 Novovladimirovka
 Osinki
 Otvodnoye
 Ovinishchi
 Pavlikovo
 Pershino
 Petrunino
 Pochinki
 Pogost
 Proletarsky
 Prosye
 Rassvet
 Rastrigino
 Rebrovo
 Rotkovo
 Rozhdestveno
 Safoneyevo
 Sapunovo
 Seltso
 Semyonovka
 Shankovo
 Shubino
 Shuklino
 Slobodishchi
 Sluchkovo
 Slukino
 Sumarokovo
 Svetilnovo
 Svyato
 Taranovo
 Tarkhanovo
 Telepovo
 Timiryazevo
 Torfopredpriyatiya Bolshoye
 Turakovo
 Vamna
 Vasenino
 Velikovo
 Veretenkovo
 Vetelnitsy
 Vnukovo
 Vyezd
 Yakutino
 Yeskino
 Yurovo
 Yuryatino
 Zaozerye
 Zelyony Dol
 Zolotovo
 Zykovo

Gus-Khrustalny 
Rural localities in Gus-Khrustalny urban okrug:

 Panfilovo

Gus-Khrustalny District 
Rural localities in Gus-Khrustalny District:

 Abbakumovo
 Aksenovo
 Alexandrovka
 Alfyorovo
 Andreyevskaya
 Anopino
 Aristovo
 Arsamaki
 Babino
 Baranovo
 Bobry
 Bolshaya Artyomovka
 Borisovo
 Borisovo
 Borzinka
 Borzino
 Budevichi
 Butylki
 Chaslitsy
 Chersevo
 Chiur
 Chyokovo
 Davydovo
 Demidovo
 Dmitriyevo
 Dobryatino
 Dolbino
 Dubasovo
 Dubrovsky
 Dudor
 Dyomino
 Erleks
 Fedotovo
 Filatovo
 Fomino
 Fyodorovka
 Gavrino
 Georgiyevo
 Golovari
 Grigoryevo
 Gubtsevo
 Ikshevo
 Ilyichyovka
 Ilyino
 Ivanishchi
 Ivanovka
 Izbishchi
 Kharlamovo
 Kolp
 Komissarovka
 Konstantinovo
 Krasnaya Zarya
 Krasny Oktyabr
 Krasny Posyolok
 Krasny Yakor
 Kryukovo
 Kupreyevo
 Kurlovo
 Kuzmino
 Larinskaya
 Lazarevka
 Lesnaya
 Lesnikovo
 Lobanovo
 Makhinsky
 Makhonino
 Maklaki
 Malaya Artyomovka
 Malinki
 Malyshkino
 Malyukovsky
 Maslikha
 Mezinovsky
 Mikhali
 Miltsevo
 Mitenino
 Mokroye
 Mordvinovo
 Morugino
 Nagorny
 Narmoch
 Narmuch
 Nechayevskaya
 Neklyudovo
 Neklyudovo
 Neverovsky
 Nikulino
 Novo-Durovo
 Novo-Maltsevo
 Novo-Novlyanovo
 Novo-Pokrovskoye
 Novoopokino
 Novouvarovka
 Obdikhovo
 Oblepikha
 Okatovo
 Orlovo
 Ostashevo
 Ostrova
 Ovintsy
 Palishchi
 Parakhino
 Pavlikovo
 Perovo
 Pershkovo
 Pervomaysky
 Poboyki
 Pochinki
 Popovichi
 Potapkovo
 Potapovskaya
 Prokshino
 Pshenitsino
 Rastovo
 Ryazanovo
 Savikovo
 Savinskaya
 Semyonovka
 Shabanovo
 Shevertni
 Sintsovo
 Sivtsevo
 Spudni
 Starkovo
 Staroopokino
 Stepanovo
 Sulovo
 Talanovo
 Talnovo
 Tashchilovo
 Tasino
 Tasinsky
 Tasinsky Bor
 Tikhonovo
 Timenka
 Tolstikovo
 Trufanovo
 Tsikul
 Tyurvishchi
 Ulyakhino
 Urshelsky
 Usady
 Vashutino
 Vasilyovo
 Vasilyovo
 Vekovka
 Velikodvorsky
 Velikodvorye
 Vyoshki
 Vyrytovo
 Yagodino
 Yakimets
 Yazvitsy
 Zabolotye
 Zakharovo
 Zakolpye
 Zakolpye
 Zalesye
 Zelyony Dol
 Zhary
 Zolotkovo
 Zolotkovsky

Kameshkovsky District 
Rural localities in Kameshkovsky District:

 Abrosimovo
 Aksentsevo
 Andreytsevo
 Arefino
 Balmyshevo
 Berkovo
 Bliznino
 Borodino
 Bryzgalovo
 Burakovo
 Chistukha
 Davydovo
 Dmitrikovo
 Druzhba
 Dvoriki
 Edemskoye
 Filyandino
 Fomikha
 Gatikha
 Gavrilsevo
 Glazovo
 Gorki
 Gorki
 Gorodok
 Grezino
 Istomino
 Ivashkovo
 Ivishenye
 Kamenovo
 Karyakino
 Kharlamovo
 Khokhlovo
 Kiryushino
 Kizhany
 Kolosovo
 Krasnoramenye
 Krasnoznamensky
 Kruglovo
 Krutovo
 Kunitsyno
 Kurmenyovo
 Laptevo
 Leontyevo
 Loshaikha
 Lubenkino
 Lubentsy
 Makarikha
 Maryinka
 Mikshino
 Mirny
 Mishnevo
 Mokeyevo
 Mostsy
 Nazarovo
 Nerlinka
 Nesterkovo
 Neverkovo
 Novaya Bykovka
 Novaya Pechuga
 Novaya Zarya
 Novki
 Novki
 Novosyolka
 Novskoye
 Ostrov
 Palashkino
 Patakino
 Penkino
 Pirogovo
 Pishchikhino
 Plyasitsyno
 Posyolok imeni Artyoma
 Posyolok imeni Frunze
 Posyolok imeni Gorkogo
 Posyolok imeni Karla Marksa
 Posyolok imeni Kirova
 Posyolok imeni Krasina
 Posyolok sanatoriya imeni Lenina
 Pozharnitsy
 Pridorozhny
 Privolye
 Ruchkino
 Ryabinovka
 Ryakhovo
 Saulovo
 Semenigino
 Serebrovo
 Sergeikha
 Shchekino
 Shukhurdino
 Simakovo
 Simonovo
 Sosnovka
 Staraya Nikola
 Stupino
 Suslovo
 Synkovo
 Terekhovitsy
 Tyntsy
 Usolye
 Vakurino
 Varkhomeyevo
 Vereshchagino
 Volkovoyno
 Vorynino
 Voskresenskoye
 Vtorovo
 Vysokovo
 Yuratino
 Zauichye
 Zhuikha

Kirzhachsky District 
Rural localities in Kirzhachsky District:

 Afanasovo
 Akulovo
 Alenino
 Arefino
 Baburino
 Bardovo
 Barsovo
 Belkovo
 Belkovo
 Beltsy
 Berezhki
 Bukhlovo
 Bynino
 Dubki
 Dubrovka
 Dvorishchi
 Filippovskoye
 Fineyevo
 Funikova Gora
 Fyodorovskoye
 Golovino
 Gorka
 Gribanovo
 Ignatovo
 Ileykino
 Ilkino
 Ilyinskoye
 Ivashevo
 Karpovo
 Karpovshchina
 Kashino
 Khalino
 Kharlamovo
 Khmelevo
 Khrapki
 Khvostovo
 Kiprevo
 Klimkovo
 Klimovo
 Korytovo
 Koshelevo
 Krasilovo
 Krasny Gornyak
 Krasny Ogorok
 Krasny Ugol
 Krutets
 Kudrino
 Kurbatovo
 Lisitsyno
 Lisitsyno
 Marinkino
 Melezha
 Mitino
 Myzzhelovo
 Naumovo
 Nedyurevo
 Nikiforovo
 Nikitkino
 Novosyolovo
 Ofushino
 Peregudovo
 Pershino
 Pesyane
 Petukhovo
 Polutino
 Ratkovo
 Rozhkovo
 Ryazanki
 Savelyevo
 Savino
 Semyonovskoye
 Sergiyevka
 Shuvalovo
 Skomorokhovo
 Slobodka
 Smolnevo
 Sopovskiye Zemlyanki
 Starkovo
 Starovo
 Telvyakovo
 Trokhino
 Trutnevo
 Vasilyovo
 Vlasyevo
 Yasnaya Polyana
 Yefanovo
 Yefremovo
 Yeltsy
 Yurtsovo
 Zakharovo
 Zarechye
 Zheldybino
 Zheldybino
 Zherdevo
 Zherdeyevo
 Znamenskoye

Kolchuginsky District 
Rural localities in Kolchuginsky District:

 Abramovka
 Aleksino
 Aleshki
 Avdotyino
 Bakinets
 Baranovka
 Barykino
 Barykino
 Bashkirdovo
 Bavleny
 Bavleny
 Berechino
 Beryozovaya Roshcha
 Bogorodskoye
 Boldinka
 Bolshevik
 Bolshoye Bratsevo
 Bolshoye Grigorovo
 Bolshoye Kuzminskoye
 Bolshoye Zabelino
 Boristsevo
 Bukharino
 Davydovskoye
 Dmitriyevsky Pogost
 Dubki
 Dubki
 Dyakonovo
 Florishchi
 Glyadki
 Golyazh
 Gorbatovka
 Ilyinskoye
 Ivashkovo
 Kashino
 Klementyevo
 Kliny
 Kliny
 Konyshevo
 Kopylki
 Korobovshchina
 Korobovshchinsky
 Koskovka
 Kosteyevo
 Kozhino
 Krasnaya Gora
 Krasny Ruchey
 Krivdino
 Krivtsovo
 Kudryavtsevo
 Ladozhino
 Lavrenikha
 Levashovo
 Litvinovo
 Litvinovo
 Litvinovskiye Khutora
 Lychyovo
 Makarovo
 Maloye Bratsevo
 Marino
 Maryino
 Metallist
 Miklyaikha
 Nefyodovka
 Nikolayevka
 Nogosekovo
 Novino
 Novobusino
 Novofetinino
 Novofrolovskoye
 Novosyolka
 Novosyolka
 Novoye
 Obukhovo
 Ogibka
 Olisavino
 Osino
 Otyayevka
 Paddubki
 Panteleyevo
 Pavlovka
 Petrushino
 Polyany
 Pozdnyakovo
 Prokudino
 Razdolye
 Safonovo
 Semendyukovo
 Serp i Molot
 Shkolny
 Shustino
 Skorodumka
 Sloboda
 Slugino
 Snegiryovo
 Sobino
 Staraya Tolba
 Staraya
 Stenki
 Sukmanikha
 Timoshkino
 Toporishchevo
 Tovarkovo
 Troitsa
 Tyutkovo
 Ulyanikha
 Vaulovo
 Vorontsovo
 Voskresenskoye
 Yakovlevo
 Yeltsino
 Yesiplevo
 Yezhovo
 Zapazhye
 Zavalino
 Zaykovo
 Zhuravlikha
 Zinovyevo
 Zolotukha

Kovrovsky District 
Rural localities in Kovrovsky District:

 Aksenikha
 Alachino
 Alexeyevskoye
 Andreyevka
 Anokhino
 Artyomovo
 Ashcherino
 Ashcherinsky karyer
 Avdotyino
 Baberikha
 Babikovka
 Baburino
 Babyonki
 Baranovo
 Bedrino
 Belkovo
 Berchakovo
 Bizimovo
 Bliznino
 Bolotsky
 Bolshakovo
 Bolshiye Vsegodichi
 Chentsy
 Cheremkha
 Chernevo
 Chernositovo
 Denisovka
 Dmitriyevo
 Dmitriyevskoye
 Doronikha
 Dostizheniye
 Drozdovka
 Dushkino
 Dyomino
 Esino
 Fatyanovo
 Fedyunino
 Filino
 Gigant
 Glebovo
 Golyshevo
 Gorozhyonovo
 Gostyukhino
 Gostyukhino
 Gostyukhinskogo karyera
 Govyadikha
 Gridino
 Igumnovo
 Ilyino
 Ivakino
 Ivanovo
 Kanabyevo
 Kariki
 Khoryatino
 Khvatachevo
 Kislyakovo
 Klyazminsky Gorodok
 Klyushnikovo
 Knyaginino
 Knyazhskaya
 Kochetikha
 Kostyunino
 Krasnaya Griva
 Krasny Mayak
 Krasny Oktyabr
 Krestnikovo
 Krestnikovo
 Krutovo
 Kryachkovo
 Kusakino
 Kuvezino
 Kuznechikha
 Lyubets
 Makarovo
 Malygino
 Malyshevo
 Malye Vsegodichi
 Marinino
 Martemyanovo
 Maryino
 Medyntsevo
 Milinovo
 Mitsino
 Mordviny
 Moshachikha
 Nerekhta
 Novinki
 Novoberyozovo
 Novoye
 Novy
 Obrashchikha
 Osipovo
 Otrub
 Ovsyannikovo
 Pakino
 Panteleyevo
 Panyukino
 Patrikeyevo
 Pavlovskoye
 Peresekino
 Pervomaysky
 Pestovo
 Ploskovo
 Pobochnevo
 Pogorelka
 Pogost
 Polevaya
 Posyolok sanatoriya imeni Abelmana
 Pustynka
 Repniki
 Rogozinikha
 Ruchey
 Rusino
 Ryabinnitsy
 Sannikovo
 Sazhino
 Seltso
 Senino
 Seninskiye Dvoriki
 Sergeytsevo
 Serkovo
 Shchibrovo
 Shevinskaya
 Shilovskoye
 Shirilikha
 Shmelyovo
 Shusherino
 Singor
 Skomorokhovo
 Smekhra
 Smolino
 Staraya
 Stepanovo
 Sukhanikha
 Sychyovo
 Teterino
 Troitsko-Nikolskoye
 Tsepelyovo
 Uvarovka
 Velikovo
 Vereyki
 Verkhutikha
 Voskhod
 Vysokovo
 Yelnikovo
 Yenikha
 Yudikha
 Yurino
 Zarya

Melenkovsky District 
Rural localities in Melenkovsky District:

 Adino
 Alexandrino
 Amosovo
 Anokhino
 Arkhangel
 Barsuki
 Bolshaya Sala
 Bolshoy Priklon
 Bolshoy Sanchur
 Boytsevo
 Butylitsy
 Chabyshevo
 Chernichenka
 Danilovo
 Denyatino
 Derevnishchi
 Dmitriyevo
 Dmitriyevy Gory
 Dobryatino
 Domnino
 Dubrovka
 Dubtsy
 Durasovo
 Dvoyezyory
 Dvoynovo
 Fursovo
 Gorodishchi
 Gorokhovo
 Grigorovo
 Ilkino
 Ivatino
 Kamenka
 Kaznevo
 Kesovo
 Kholkovo
 Kholkovsky
 Kochetki
 Kochetki
 Kondakovo
 Kononovo
 Kopnino
 Korikovo
 Korovino
 Krasnovo
 Krutaya
 Kruttsy
 Kudrino
 Kulaki
 Kuzmino
 Lekhtovo
 Levenda
 Levino
 Luzhi
 Luzhki
 Lyakhi
 Maly Priklon
 Maly Sanchur
 Maximovka
 Maximovo
 Milna
 Muralyovo
 Muratovo
 Novenkaya
 Novo-Barsukovo
 Novonikolayevskoye
 Okshovo
 Orlovka
 Osinki
 Ozornovo
 Panovo
 Panovsky
 Papulino
 Pichugino
 Priklon
 Prosenitsy
 Prudnya
 Ramen
 Ratnovo
 Repino
 Rozhdestveno
 Savkovo
 Selino
 Shokhino
 Sinzhany
 Skripino
 Slavtsevo
 Sofronovo
 Sokolye
 Sovetsky
 Starinki
 Stepankovo
 Timoshino
 Tolstikovo
 Turgenevo
 Ulanovka
 Urvanovo
 Uryusevo
 Usad
 Vasilyevsky
 Venedeyevka
 Verkhounzha
 Verkhozerye
 Vichkino
 Vologdino
 Voynovo
 Voyutino
 Vypolzovo
 Vysokovo
 Yelino
 Yuzhny
 Zimnitsy
 Zlobino

Murom urban okrug 
Rural localities in Murom urban okrug:

 Fabriki im. P. L. Voykova
 Orlovo
 Yakimanskaya Sloboda

Muromsky District 
Rural localities in Muromsky District:

 Afanasovo
 Aleshunino
 Alexandrovka
 Baburino
 Berdishchevo
 Berezovka
 Bezlesnaya
 Blagoveshchenskoye
 Bolshoye Yuryevo
 Borisogleb
 Borisovo
 Borok
 Borovitsy
 Bulatnikovo
 Chaadayevo
 Cheremisino
 Dmitriyevka
 Dmitriyevskaya Sloboda
 Dyakonovo
 Fedorkovo
 Glebovka
 Gribkovo
 Ignatyevo
 Ivankovo
 Katyshevo
 Khorobritsy
 Klimovo
 Koldino
 Kommuna
 Kondrakovo
 Korzhavino
 Kovarditsy
 Krasny Bor
 Krivitsy
 Lazarevo
 Lesnikovo
 Makarovka
 Maloye Yuryevo
 Martynovo
 Mezhishchi
 Mikhalchugovo
 Mikhalevo
 Mikhaylovka
 Mikhaylovo
 Mishino
 Molotitsy
 Mordvinovo
 Muromsky
 Nezhilovka
 Novoye Ratovo
 Novye Kotlitsy
 Nula
 Okheyevo
 Okulovo
 Olgino
 Ozhigovo
 Penza
 Pestenkino
 Petrokovo
 Poleskovo
 Poltso
 Popolutovo
 Posyolok Mekhanizatorov
 Probuzhdeniye
 Prudishchi
 Ramezhki
 Rozhnovo
 Safonovo
 Saksino
 Sannikovo
 Savanchakovo
 Savkovo
 Shishlovo
 Sobolevo
 Sosnitsy
 Staroye Ratovo
 Starye Kotlitsy
 Stepankovo
 Strigino
 Talyzino
 Tatarovo
 Valovo
 Varezh
 Volnino
 Zagryazhskoye
 Zakharovo
 Zaroslovo
 Zhemchuzhino
 Zimyonki

Petushinsky District 
Rural localities in Petushinsky District:

 Abbakumovo
 Abrosovo
 Aksenovo
 Alexino
 Andreyevskoye
 Aniskino
 Ankudinovo
 Antushovo
 Barskovo
 Beryozka
 Bliznetsy
 Bogdarnya
 Boldino
 Boldino
 Bolshiye Gorki
 Borok
 Chashcha
 Cherkasovo
 Chupriyanovo
 Denisovo
 Domashnevo
 Dubrovka
 Filimonovo
 Glubokovo
 Gnezdino
 Golovino
 Gora
 Gorushka
 Gospodinovo
 Gribovo
 Ilyinki
 Ivanovo
 Kalinino
 Karavayevo
 Kibiryovo
 Kirzhach
 Klyazmensky
 Kobyaki
 Kolobrodovo
 Kostino
 Krasny Luch
 Krutovo
 Kryuki
 Kukushkino
 Kuzyayevo
 Lakibrovo
 Larionovo
 Leonovo
 Letovo
 Lipna
 Logintsevo
 Lugovoy
 Malye Gorki
 Markovo
 Markovo
 Marochkovo
 Mashinostroitel
 Maslyanye Gorochki
 Metenino
 Mikheytsevo
 Molodilovo
 Molodino
 Myachikovo
 Myshlino
 Nagorny
 Naputnovo
 Nazarovo
 Nerazh
 Norkino
 Novinki
 Novoye Annino
 Novy Spas
 Novye Omutishchi
 Ostrovishchi
 Ovchinino
 Pakhomovo
 Panfilovo
 Pavlovo
 Peksha
 Pernovo
 Plotavtsevo
 Podvyaznovo
 Pokrovskogo lesouchastka
 Polomy
 Popinovo
 Posyolok Pokrovskogo torfouchastka
 Repikhovo
 Rodionovo
 Roshchino
 Rozhdestvo
 Rusanovo
 Sanino
 Saninskogo DOKa
 Shibotovo
 Sitnikovo
 Sosnovy Bor
 Stanovtsovo
 Staroye Annino
 Staroye Perepechino
 Staroye Seltso
 Staroye Semyonkovo
 Staroye Stenino
 Starye Omutishchi
 Starye Petushki
 Stepanovo
 Sukovatovo
 Sushnevo-1
 Sushnevo-2
 Taratino
 Teleshovo
 Trud
 Tsepnino
 Tuykovo
 Vasilki
 Vaultsevo
 Veselovo
 Vetchi
 Volkovo
 Volosovo
 Voronovo
 Voskresenye
 Vospushka
 Vyalovo
 Yefimtsevo
 Yeliseykovo
 Yemelyantsevo
 Yermolino
 Yeskino
 Yevdokimtsevo
 Yuchmer
 Zabolotye
 Zadneye Pole
 Zhary
 Zheltukhino
 Zheludyevo

Selivanovsky District 
Rural localities in Selivanovsky District:

 Alyoshkovo
 Andreyevka
 Belkovo
 Bolshoye Grigorovo
 Bolshoye Koltsovo
 Bolshoye Ugryumovo
 Chernovskaya
 Chertkovo
 Delovo
 Denisovo
 Drachyovo
 Dubrovo
 Golovino
 Goritsy
 Gubino
 Gusyok
 Ilyinskoye
 Isakovo
 Ivankovo (Chertkovskoye Rural Settlement)
 Ivankovo (Malyshevskoye Rural Settlement)
 Ivanovskaya
 Ivonino
 Karpovo
 Khvostsovo
 Kochergino
 Kopnino
 Korelkino
 Kostenets
 Krasnaya Gorka
 Krasnaya Ushna
 Kurkovo
 Lobanovo
 Lukoyanikha
 Maloye Grigorovo
 Malyshevo
 Maryevka
 Matveyevka
 Mitrofanovo
 Mityakovo
 Mokrovo
 Nadezhdino
 Nagovitsyno
 Neklyudovo
 Nekrasovo
 Nikolo-Ushna
 Nikulino
 Novlyanka
 Novlyanka (settlement)
 Novoye Bibeyevo
 Novy Byt
 Parshovo
 Pchyolkino
 Perelozhnikovo
 Pervomaysky
 Petrovskoye
 Poshatovo
 Pribrezhnaya
 Sanchugovo
 Savino
 Savkovo
 Selishchi
 Senkovo
 Shiryayevo
 Shulgino
 Skalovo
 Staroye Bibeyevo
 Svyatsy
 Takovikha
 Terenino
 Troitsko-Kolychyovo
 Tuchkovo
 Vikhirevo
 Voshchikha
 Vysokovo
 Yartsevo
 Yekaterinovka
 Yesipovo
 Yuromka
 Zakharovo
 Zarechye
 Zhary
 Znamenka

Sobinsky District 
Rural localities in Sobinsky District:

 Afanasyevo
 Alepino
 Anfimikha
 Antsiferovo
 Arbuzovo
 Artyushino
 Aserkhovo
 Astafyevo
 Azikovo
 Babayevo
 Baranniki
 Batyushkovo
 Berezniki
 Bezvodnoye
 Bokovino
 Bolgary
 Bolshiye Ostrova
 Bolshoye Ivankovo
 Bratilovo
 Bratonezh
 Bukholovo
 Bulanovo
 Burykino
 Buzakovo
 Chaganovo
 Cherkutino
 Chizhovo
 Churilovo
 Danilovka
 Demidovo
 Demikhovo
 Dobrynino
 Dubrovka
 Dubrovo
 Fedotovo
 Fedurnovo
 Fetinino
 Filino
 Frolikha
 Fyodorovka
 Glukhovo
 Gnusovo
 Golovino
 Golubino
 Goryamino
 Ivlevo
 Kadyevo
 Kaliteyevo
 Karacharovo
 Karpovo
 Kharitonovo
 Khrenovo
 Khrenovo
 Khryastovo
 Kishleyevo
 Kochukovo
 Kolokolnitsa
 Koloksha
 Koloksha
 Konino
 Konnovo
 Kopnino
 Kopytovo
 Korchagino
 Kornevo
 Korobovo
 Koroyedovo
 Kosmino
 Kostino
 Koverlevo
 Krutoy Ovrag
 Krutoyak
 Kudelino
 Kurilovo
 Kuzmino
 Kuznetsovo
 Kuznetsy
 Lapino
 Levino
 Litovka
 Luchinskoye
 Malakhovo
 Malye Ostrova
 Maximikha
 Meshchyora
 Mikhlino
 Mitrofanikha
 Monakovo
 Mosyagino
 Nazarovo
 Nerozhino
 Nikulino
 Nikulino
 Novosyolovo
 Oderikhino
 Omoforovo
 Orekhovo
 Osovets
 Parfentyevo
 Pasynkovo
 Perebor
 Pesteryugino
 Petrushino
 Piskutino
 Podvyazye
 Pogost
 Pushnino
 Pushnino
 Ratmirovo
 Remni
 Rozhdestveno
 Rukav
 Rybkhoz Vorsha
 Rylovo
 Ryzhkovo
 Semyonovskoye
 Sergeyevo
 Sheldyakovo
 Shepeli
 Shunovo
 Shuvalikha
 Spasskoye
 Spasskoye
 Spirino
 Stepanikha
 Stepankovo
 Stolbishchi
 Strukovo
 Sulukovo
 Taratinka
 Teplinovo
 Teterino
 Tolpukhovo
 Tsepelevo
 Turino
 Turovo
 Ugor
 Ugryumikha
 Undolsky
 Ustye
 Uvarovo
 Vaganovo
 Val
 Vasilyevka
 Vasilyovo
 Vezhbolovo
 Vishnyakovo
 Volosovo
 Vorsha
 Voshilovo
 Vyshmanovo
 Yagodnoye
 Yakovlevo
 Yelkhovitsa
 Yelkhovka
 Yeltesunovo
 Yermonino
 Yerosovo
 Yurino
 Yurino
 Yurovo
 Zaprudye
 Zarechnoye
 Zhabino
 Zherekhovo
 Zhokhovo
 Zubovo

Sudogodsky District 
Rural localities in Sudogodsky District:

 Afonino
 Aksenovo
 Alexandrovo
 Alfyorovo
 Alfyorovo
 Andreyevo
 Avdotyino
 Bakhtino
 Baraki
 Barkino
 Bashevo
 Baygushi
 Beg
 Berezhki
 Bogdantsevo
 Bokusha
 Bolotsky
 Bolshaya Kozlovka
 Borisogleb
 Brykino
 Brykino
 Burlygino
 Bykovo
 Chamerevo
 Cherepovo
 Cherepukhino
 Danilovka
 Daniltsevo
 Demukhino
 Dorofeyevo
 Dubenki
 Dvorishnevo
 Fryazino
 Gladyshevo
 Golovino
 Gonobilovo
 Gorki
 Goryachevo
 Gridino
 Ilyino
 Inyutino
 Isakovo
 Kadyevo
 Kamenets
 Karevo
 Karpovo
 Kartmazovo
 Kashmanovo
 Khokhlachi
 Kiselnitsa
 Klimovskaya
 Kliny
 Kolesnya
 Kolychevo
 Komary
 Kondryayevo
 Konyushino
 Kordon Moshokskogo lesnichestva
 Korostelikha
 Korostelyovo
 Koshcheyevo
 Kostino
 Kostrovo
 Krasnaya Gorka
 Krasny Bogatyr
 Kudryavtsevo
 Ladoga
 Lavrovo
 Likino
 Lisavino
 Lobanovo
 Lukhtonovo
 Lukinskogo doma invalidov
 Lukinskoye
 Lunkovo
 Malakhovo
 Malaya Kozlovka
 Maryukhino
 Maslovo
 Medvedtsevo
 Michurino
 Mikhalevo
 Mikhalevo
 Mitino
 Mitkino
 Mitroshino
 Mordasovo
 Moshok
 Mostishchi
 Muromtsevo
 Myzino
 Nagornoye
 Natalyinka
 Nepeytsino
 Nevryuyevo
 Nikitino
 Nizhnyaya Zaninka
 Novaya
 Novo-Petrovo
 Novokarpovka
 Novoye Polkhovo
 Ovsyanikovo
 Ovsyannikovo
 Ovtsyno
 Ozyablitsy
 Panfilovo
 Patrikeyevo
 Pavlovskaya
 Penki
 Peredel
 Peredel
 Pigasovo
 Poddol
 Pogrebishchi
 Polushkino
 Popelyonki
 Posyolok Lnozavoda
 Posyolok imeni Vorovskogo
 Prokunino
 Prokunino
 Proskurinskaya
 Radilovo
 Raguzino
 Rayki
 Razlukino
 Rogovo
 Rychkovo
 Shipilovo
 Shustovo
 Sinitsyno
 Slashchyovo
 Smykovo
 Sokolovo
 Sorokino
 Soyma
 Spas-Beseda
 Spas-Kupalishche
 Stanki
 Starikovo
 Staroye Chubarovo
 Staroye Kubayevo
 Staroye Polkhovo
 Stepachyovo
 Styopanovo
 Sukhovka
 Telesnikovo
 Tikhonovo
 Timeryovo
 Tolstovo
 Torzhkovo
 Travinino
 Trofimovka
 Trukhachyovo
 Tsvetkovo
 Turovo
 Ulybyshevo
 Ushakovo
 Vaneyevka
 Vasilyevo
 Verigino
 Verkhnyaya Zaninka
 Volnaya Artyomovka
 Vyatkino
 Vyozhki
 Vysokovo
 Yakushevo
 Yazykovo
 Yefimovskaya
 Zagorye
 Zakharovo
 Zayastrebye
 Zharki
 Zhukovka

Suzdalsky District 
Rural localities in Suzdalsky District:

 Abakumlevo
 Alferikha
 Babarino
 Bagrinovo
 Barskoye-Gorodishche
 Baskaki
 Bereznitsy
 Bogolyubka
 Bogolyubovo
 Bogoslovo
 Bolshoye Borisovo
 Borisovskoye
 Borodino
 Brodnitsy
 Brutovo
 Chernizh
 Chirikovo
 Dobrynskoye
 Dorzhevo
 Drovniki
 Filippushi
 Fyodorovskoye
 Gavrilovskoye
 Glebovskoye
 Gnezdilovo
 Goloventsino
 Goritsy
 Gridino
 Grigorevo
 Gubachevo
 Ivanovskoye
 Khotenskoye
 Kibol
 Kideksha
 Kistysh
 Klementyevo
 Koziki
 Krapivye
 Krasnogvardeysky
 Krasnoye Sushchyovo
 Krasnoye
 Kutukovo
 Lemeshki
 Lopatnitsy
 Lyakhovitsy
 Malakhovo
 Malininsky
 Malo-Boriskovo
 Maslenka
 Menchakovo
 Mordysh
 Nikulskoye
 Novaya Derevnya
 Novgorodskoye
 Novoalexandrovo
 Novokamenskoye
 Novosyolka Nerlskaya
 Novosyolka
 Novoye
 Novy
 Obrashchikha
 Olikovo
 Omutskoye
 Oslavskoye
 Ovchukhi
 Pantelikha
 Pavlovskoye
 Pereborovo
 Pesochnoye
 Petrakovo
 Podberezye
 Pogost-Bykovo
 Poretskoye
 Prudy
 Ramenye
 Romanovo
 Sadovy
 Sanino
 Seltso
 Semyonovskoye-Krasnoye
 Semyonovskoye-Sovetskoye
 Seslavskoye
 Skorodumka
 Snovitsy
 Sodyshka
 Sokol
 Spasskoye-Gorodishche
 Stary Dvor
 Subbotino
 Sukhodol
 Suromna
 Sushchyovo
 Suvorotskoye
 Tarbayevo
 Teremets
 Tereneyevo
 Teterino
 Torchino
 Troitsa-Bereg
 Tsibeyevo
 Turovo
 Turtino
 Ulovo
 Vasilkovo
 Velisovo
 Ves
 Viltsovo
 Vishenki
 Vnukovo
 Vorontsovo
 Voskresenskaya Slobodka
 Vypovo
 Vyselki
 Vysheslavskoye
 Yakimanskoye
 Yanovets
 Yanyovo
 Zagorye
 Zapolitsy
 Zeleni

Sysertsky District 
Rural localities in Sysertsky District:

 Abramovo

Vladimir 
Rural localities in Vladimir urban okrug:

 Abbakumovo
 Bukholovo
 Dolgaya Luzha
 Krasnoye Ekho
 Kusunovo
 Mosino
 Nemtsovo
 Nikulino
 Oborino
 Panfilovo
 Rakhmanov Perevoz
 Shepelevo
 Ushcher
 Vilki
 Zaklyazmensky
 Zlobino

Vyaznikovsky District 
Rural localities in Vyaznikovsky District:

 Abrosimovo
 Afanasyevo
 Agafonovo
 Aksenovo
 Alyoshinskaya
 Ananyino
 Artyomkovo
 Babskoye Tatarovo
 Babukhino
 Bakhtolovo
 Belaya Ramen
 Belyaikha
 Bolshevysokovo
 Bolshiye Lipki
 Bolshiye Udoly
 Bolshoy Kholm
 Bolshoye Filisovo
 Bolymotikha
 Borodino
 Borzyn
 Bragino
 Brodniki
 Burino
 Burkovo
 Burtsevo
 Butorlino
 Bykovka
 Chernevo
 Chernomorye
 Chudinovo
 Danilkovo
 Druzhnaya
 Dudkino
 Dyakonovo
 Edon
 Fedorkovo
 Fedoseikha
 Fedurniki
 Fomina Ramen
 Galkino
 Glinishchi
 Glubokovo
 Golovino
 Goremykino
 Gridinskaya
 Igumentsy
 Ilevniki
 Ilyina Gora
 Isakovka
 Isayevo
 Ivankovo
 Ivanovka
 Kalikino
 Kality
 Kamenevo
 Kharino
 Khudyakovo
 Kika
 Kitovo
 Klimovskaya
 Klyuchevo
 Komlevo
 Koptsevo
 Korovintsevo
 Korshunikha
 Kostenevo
 Kourkovo
 Kozlovka
 Kozlovo
 Krutovka
 Krutye
 Krutye Gorki
 Kudryavtsevo
 Kurbatikha
 Kuzmino
 Lapino
 Likhaya Pozhnya
 Lipovskaya Usadba
 Log
 Luknovo
 Malovskaya
 Maloye Vysokovo
 Maly Kholm
 Malye Lipki
 Malye Udoly
 Maryino
 Matyukino
 Medvedevo
 Merkutino
 Miklyayevo
 Mitinskaya
 Mitiny Derevenki
 Mstyora
 Naguyevo
 Naleskino
 Namestovo
 Nevezhino
 Novo
 Novosyolka
 Obednino
 Okatovo
 Okhlopkovo
 Oktyabrskaya
 Oktyabrsky
 Oltushevo
 Osinki
 Palkino
 Palkovo
 Paustovo
 Perovo
 Pervomaysky
 Peski
 Pirovy-Gorodishchi
 Pivovarovo
 Ploskovo
 Ponomaryovo
 Pozdnyakovo
 Prigorevo
 Priozerny
 Ramenye
 Rastovo
 Rogovskaya
 Romashyovo
 Rudelyovo
 Rudilnitsy
 Ryabikha
 Rytovo
 Sankhar
 Saryevo (selo)
 Saryevo (settlement) 
 Sedelnikovo
 Selishche
 Seltsovy Derevenki
 Selyankino
 Senino
 Senkovo
 Sergeyevo
 Sergiyevy-Gorki
 Serkovo
 Serkovo
 Shatnevo
 Shchekino
 Shustovo
 Simontsevo
 Singer
 Sinyatkino
 Sizovo
 Skolepovo
 Slobodka
 Sosenki
 Sosnovka
 Stanki
 Starygino
 Stavrovo
 Stepkovo
 Stryapkovo
 Stupiny Derevenki
 Styopantsevo
 Suvoloka
 Suytino
 Sysoyevo
 Tabachikha
 Timino
 Topolyovka
 Torchikha
 Troitskoye-Tatarovo
 Trukhachikha
 Tsentralny
 Usady
 Uspensky Pogost
 Vasilki
 Vorobyevka
 Voronino
 Voynovo
 Vyazovka
 Vysokovo
 Yam
 Yamki
 Yandovy
 Yar
 Yasnye Zori
 Yerofeyevo
 Yuryshki
 Zaborochye
 Zakharovka
 Zarechny
 Zavrazhye
 Zelyonye Prudy
 Zhartsy
 Zhary
 Zhelnino
 Zlobayevo
 Zobishchi
 Zolotaya Griva

Yuryev-Polsky District 
Rural localities in Yuryev-Polsky District:

 Afineyevo
 Alexino
 Andreyevskoye (Krasnoselskoye Rural Settlement)
 Andreyevskoye (Nebylovskoye Rural Settlement)
 Avdotyino
 Baskaki
 Belyanitsyno
 Berezniki
 Bildino
 Bogdanovskoye
 Bogdanovsky rybopitomnik
 Bogorodskoye
 Chekovo
 Cherkasovo
 Dergayevo
 Dobrynskoye
 Drozdovo
 Dubrava
 Entuziast
 Fedosyino
 Frolovskoye
 Fyodorovskoye (Nebylovskoye Rural Settlement)
 Fyodorovskoye (Simskoye Rural Settlement)
 Gavriltsevo
 Gorki
 Gorodishche
 Goryainovo
 Grigorovo
 Ilyinskoye
 Ivorovo
 Kalinovka
 Kamenka
 Karabanikha
 Karandyshevo
 Karelskaya Slobodka
 Khoroshovka
 Khvoyny
 Kirpichny Zavod
 Knyazhikha
 Kokorekino
 Kolenovo
 Kolokoltsevo
 Kosagovo
 Kosinskoye
 Kotluchino
 Krasnaya Gorka
 Krasnoye Zarechye
 Krasnoye
 Kubayevo
 Kuchki
 Kumino
 Kuzmadino
 Lednevo (selo)
 Lednevo (station)
 Listvenny
 Lykovo
 Maloluchinskoye
 Markovo
 Matveyshchevo
 Maymor
 Mukino
 Nebyloye
 Nenashevskoye
 Nesterovo
 Nikulskoye
 Novaya
 Novoye
 Opolye
 Ozyorny
 Palazino
 Parkovy
 Parsha
 Pavlovskoye
 Peremilovo
 Podlesny
 Podolets
 Poyelovo
 Prechistaya Gora
 Prigorodny
 Radovanye
 Ratislovo
 Rucheyki
 Ryabinki
 Semyinskoye
 Shadrino
 Shegodskaya
 Shikhobalovo
 Shipilovo
 Sima
 Simizino
 Soroguzhino
 Sosnovy Bor
 Spasskoye
 Starkovo (station)
 Starnikovo
 Svaino
 Tartyshevo
 Tereshki
 Tursino
 Turygino
 Varvarino
 Vasilyevka
 Volstvinovo
 Voskresenskoye
 Vyoska
 Vypolzovo
 Yelokh
 Yeltsy
 Yurkovo
 Zaborye
 Zhelezovo
 Zventsovo

See also 
 
 Lists of rural localities in Russia

References 

Vladimir Oblast